Stefano Cristiani, (born 4 November 1958) is an Italian astronomer and astrophysicist.

Career
Cristiani graduated in Physics at the University of Rome La Sapienza, carrying out his thesis work at the Asiago Astrophysical Observatory. He held a post-doctoral and staff positions at the European Southern Observatory, La Silla Observatory, University of Padua, and Trieste Astronomical Observatory. 
He has been director of the Trieste Astronomical Observatory from 2005 to 2010 and a member of the Board of
INAF from 2011 to 2013.

The main areas of his research are: extragalactic astronomy, cosmology, formation and evolution of galaxies, quasars, advanced data analysis methods.

Honours
Awards
1976, 1977, 1978, 1979: Enrico Persico award of the Accademia dei Lincei

External links
 Stefano Cristiani's home page
 Stefano Cristiani at Academia.edu
 Stefano Cristiani at International Astronomical Union 

1958 births
21st-century Italian astronomers
Living people